Suomen Partiolaiset - Finlands Scouter ry (The Guides and Scouts of Finland, GSF) is the national Scouting and Guiding association of Finland. Scouting was founded in Finland in 1910 as part of the Russian Empire, registered with the central organization of the tsarist Russian Scout movement Русский Скаут. Finnish Scouting was among the charter members of the World Organization of the Scout Movement in 1922. Guiding started in 1910 and was among the founding members of the World Association of Girl Guides and Girl Scouts. In 1972 the Girl Guide Association and the Boy Scout Association merged and formed Suomen Partiolaiset. The association has about 75,000 members.

In Finland, the Scouting movement was viewed early on as an alternative to the Pioneers communist youth organization, which was active for some time in the Nordic nation.

Programme

The Finnish Scout organization is a nonpolitical, nonsectarian and multilingual organization, as evidenced by the name of the organization itself, using both the Finnish and Swedish languages. Its religious neutrality is reflected in the Finnish Scout promise, which begins "I promise to love my God..."

Scouting is one of the most popular hobbies in Finland. To live with nature, act according to its conditions and protecting and honoring it, is one of the cornerstones of Finnish Scouting. Another important objective is to learn social abilities. Finnish Scouts and Guides learn how to become knowledgeable and active citizens, at ease with other countries and cultures. Finnish Scouting culture itself includes wearing a unique skullcap hat called a väiski as part of the uniform.

In this country of thousands of lakes and abundance of green forests, hikes and camps are a vital part of Scouting. Outdoor activities, winter camps and skiing tours greatly test the knowledge and skills of the Scouts.

All groups plan and execute their own programs and emphasize special interests. Community involvement and service to help members become active, responsible members of society are stressed in the program.

Sea Scouts carry out many kinds of activities related to sailing and undergo an extensive training program in seamanship, with an emphasis on safety. They have large on-the-water gatherings every year and a Sea Scout camp every four years.

The Finnish Scouts have close international ties with Scouts in other countries, particularly Scandinavian countries. They have also expanded its international connections to Russia through youth exchanges between the two countries. Scouts in Finland are actively involved in development projects in Africa and have raised funds for the immunization program for Nepal.

Scout Promise
I promise to do my best 
to love my God, my country and the world, 
to fulfil the Ideals of the <age section> 
and to be of help to others.

Oldest unit
Toimen Pojat (Unga Fribyggare in Swedish), a Scouting troop in Kauniainen, Finland was established in 1910. Toimen Pojat is the oldest continuously operating Scout troop in Finland. During the Russian ban on Scouting in the 1910s before the Finnish independence in 1917, the troop operated underground. Many traditions that distinguish the troop formed during that period.

Structures
Suomen Partiolaiset is divided in 10 Scout districts, which resemble the former Finnish provinces. The only exception is Finlands Svenska Scouter r.f. serving the Swedish minority in Finland and the Åland Islands. 11% of the 7- to 10-year-olds and 13% of 10- to 14-year-old Finns are members of the organization. Girl Scouts represent 56% of the total. There are about 900 Scout troops.

Jamborees
Suomen Partiolaiset has organised a number of Jamborees, known as "FinnJamboree"s:

See also
Jarl Wahlström

References

External links

Official website 
Official website 

World Association of Girl Guides and Girl Scouts member organizations
World Organization of the Scout Movement member organizations
Scouting and Guiding in Finland
Youth organizations established in 1972
1972 establishments in Finland